Moldova participated in the Junior Eurovision Song Contest 2012, with their entry selected through a non-televised national selection.

Before Junior Eurovision

National final
6 entries were submitted to TRM, which all were chosen to compete in the national final.

On 4 October 2012, the six entries were performed in front of a jury, which consisted of Georgeta Voinovan, Vlad Mircos, Natali Toma, Adrian Ursu and Ion Chiorpec. Denis Midone was eventually selected as the Moldovan representative for the 2012 contest.

At Junior Eurovision

Voting

Notes

References

Junior Eurovision Song Contest
Moldova
Junior